Acratas, also known as the anti-crats, was a protest group formed at Complutense University of Madrid, Spain, by Agustin Garcia Calvo in 1967. Acratas, influenced by new protest movement amongst students abroad, was anarchist rather than Marxist in character, against all authority, & protested by asserting their right to have fun by ridiculing the ideas, individuals and groups they despised.

External links
Acratas in the Anarchist Encyclopedia

Anarchist organisations in Spain
Defunct anarchist organizations in Europe